Bait-and-switch is a form of fraud or false advertising.

Bait and Switch may also refer to:
Bait and Switch (book) by Barbara Ehrenreich (2006)
"Bait and Switch", a 2009 episode of This American Life

in music:
Bait and Switch (album) by Thomas Jefferson Slave Apartments (1995)
"Bait & Switch", a song from the KMFDM album Blitz
"Bait & Switch", a song from the Saliva album Survival of the Sickest
 Bait and Switch", a track from the Firesign Theatre comedy album Eat or Be Eaten
in television:
"Bait & Switch", an episode of Fantastic Four: World's Greatest Heroes
"Bait & Switch", an episode of The Good Guys (2010 TV series)
"Bait & Switch", an episode of Swamp People 
"Bait and Switch", an episode of Las Vegas
Bait & Switch, a novel based on the TV show The O.C.